Dan Muller aka Daniel Cody Muller (1889–1976), artist, illustrator and writer of the American West; Muller was born in Choteau, Montana, October 11, 1889 to Carl and Augusta Muller.

Early life 

Muller's early years are known only from the artist's own recollections of them. In one of his five published books, "My Life with Buffalo Bill", the artist alleges that his father, who was allegedly one quarter Piegan Blackfoot, was killed by a horse when Muller was nine years old, and he (the artist) was adopted by Buffalo Bill Cody. Muller then grew up and spent 18 years working with Cody in his Wild West shows and on Cody's ranches.(see Footnote 1 below)

Muller wrote that he met C.M. Russell about 1900 in Choteau MT (about 50 miles from Russell's home town of Great Falls) and was influenced in his art by Russell. In a 1964 Milwaukee newspaper article, Muller was described by a Taos NM art gallery owner as "...the Russell or Remington of our day".

He spent the years of World War I breaking horses for the army, and sold his first painting professionally in New York City in January 1917. He subsequently worked as a ranch hand while traveling by horseback from Mexico to Canada and back to the American West. He was in New York City again around 1929, and then worked in Chicago from 1930 until about 1933.

Painting and writing

Muller wrote that he sold his early paintings to tourists in Yellowstone Park.

In 1933, Muller painted three 100 foot murals for the Travel and Transport exhibit of the Century of Progress Chicago World's Fair. That same year he wrote and illustrated an original short story titled "Break 'Em Gentle" for the premier October 1933 issue of Esquire Magazine- an issue which also featured works by Ernest Hemingway, Dashiell Hammett, Ring Lardner, John Dos Passos and others.

He settled for a while in Elko, Nevada in the mid-1930s where he painted murals and signs as well as original artwork. He painted murals for the famous Town House restaurant/casino in Reno NV. 
In 1936 the artist had a painting chosen to represent the state of NV in the First National Exhibition of American Art at Rockefeller Center in New York City (an oil titled "Tangle Foot"; City of NY Municipal Art Committee booklet, 1936, pg28). In the late 1930s Muller continued to paint and do illustrations- he drew two (July 1937 and December 1940) cover pieces for the rodeo magazine Hoofs and Horns, an honor he shared with at least one other well known cowboy artist, Olaf Wieghorst.

Writing

In 1936, Muller's first book "Horses" was published. This book consisted of varied illustrations of horses, a major theme of Muller's work. The book was published with an initial run of 150 leather bound, signed editions. An article in the Nevada State Journal of May 3, 1939 stated of this work: "Dan Muller, the artist, is unique. These are not merely accurate drawings of horses- from the cow pony to the hunter, the Percheron and the race- but character studies... There is real art in his appreciation of horse expression as revealed by toss of head, look of eyes, and tenseness or ease of muscles..."The book is also full of good horse humor..." "The Eugene Field Society conferred an honorary membership on Muller for 'outstanding contribution to contemporary literature...".

Muller had a second book published in 1938, "Chico of the +Up Ranch". Although fictional, the "+Up Ranch" is where Muller states he was born, and the +Up logo appears in a number of Muller's artworks.

About 1942, Muller relocated to Port Washington, Wisconsin. During the 1940s and into the 1950s Muller did dozens of cover paintings and illustrated stories for Zane Grey's Western Magazine, again sharing the honor with other western art notables such as Nicholas Firfires, Leonard Reedy and the aforementioned Wieghorst.

Muller illustrated a 1945 edition of Black Beauty by Anna Sewell. He also illustrated the book "Gene Autry and the Thief River Outlaws" in 1944.

In 1948, the third of Muller's books, "My Life with Buffalo Bill" was published. The book was autobiographical in nature, but likely would fall into the category of "tall tale". In a review the Chicago Tribune described the book as a "fascinating volume...superbly illustrated by the author" and Muller as "one of the world's great artists of western ranch life."

Muller reportedly had his painting 'The Last Roundup' purchased by Nevada Senator George Malone; ("Trailings of Yesteryear" & Nevada State Journal, March 25, 1951). (Note: There does exist a painting entitled 'Riders in the Sky' that has a placard with the inscription 'Presented to Hon Senator George W Malone by Jack Fugitt Reno Nevada'. It is unknown if this is the painting mentioned in the book and newspaper as 'The Last Roundup'.)

During the late 1940s and into the 1950s Muller teamed with Eugene Freedman (who later went on to found the Enesco Corporation, distributor of Precious Moments figurines) to produce a series of western themed chalkware plaques and small statues modeled on Muller's paintings and sold under the label of Dan Muller Creations.

He also had artwork used on covers of other western magazines such as True West, Old West and Frontier Times.

Muller did several paintings of Native Americans that were made a permanent part of the collection of the Koshare Indian Museum. "Muller and Koshare museum founder Buck Burshears met on a train from Chicago to La Junta, Colorado in May 1963. Muller wrote of the experience: 'I found Mr. Burshears the sort of man that is a privilege to meet and I'm heaps better off for the meeting.'Included in the exhibit are personal correspondence between Muller and Burshears, and photographs and paintings." (Pueblo Chieftain, March 12, 2004).

Muller continued to paint and draw in WI until his death on December 4, 1976. He had two additional books published: "Ride 'Em and Rope 'Em with a Pencil", a how to sketch book, and "Trailings of Yesteryear" which was published posthumously.

Muller was a major influence on artist Ross Stefan, as noted in "Ross Stefan: An Impressionistic Painter of the Contemporary Southwest" by John K Goodman (pg 8). Ross Stefan met Muller in WI in the 1940s.

"Many of Muller's firsthand experiences in the Old West are depicted in his oils, watercolors and pastels. His work is done in a documentary style, which is punctuated with great authenticity. He was careful to portray exact detail in the clothing and gear of his subjects, as well as in the background scenes. He also had a keen knowledge of horseflesh... His paintings are owned by museums and private collectors throughout the United States, Canada, Europe and South America." Dorothy Harmsen, 1977, "American Western Art". (Mrs. Harmsen and her husband Bill Harmsen were involved in collecting Western Art. Some of the works included were by artists such as Frederic Remington, George Catlin, and Muller. In 2001 the couple donated close to 5,000 pieces of art and American West memorabilia to the Denver Art Museum).(The Harmsen Collection Denver Art Museum contains works by artists and photographers who charted the colonization of the American West in the late 19th and early 20th centuries, such as Frederic Remington, Charles M Russell, Frank E. Schoonover, and Frank Tenney Johnson as well as more modern interpreters of American & Western art, such as Gerald Curtis Delano, Harvey Dunn, Dan Muller and Raymond Jonson.)

Jim Binson, of Binson's Home Health Care Centers, has amassed one of the largest Western Art Collections in the United States, including several Muller paintings. The Binson Collection has now been donated to the Cheyenne Frontier Days Old West Museum in Cheyenne Wyoming; from CFD Old West Museum: "The collection includes works from some of America's greatest western artists such as Frederic Remington, Dan Muller...".) Works of Muller's are also in museums such as the Petrie Institute of Western American Art at Denver Art Museum, and Cushing Library at Texas A&M University.

Muller's work can be dated approximately by the appearance of his signature. Works dating up to the early 1930s are signed "D C Muller" and utilize a swastika symbol, possibly due to his father's Native American heritage, the symbol being in common usage in many cultures worldwide including Native American. In works dating from the later 1930s on Muller signed simply "Dan Muller" with a slash line above and below his name, having abandoned the swastika around the time of its appropriation by Nazi Germany. (Note: One of Dan Muller's earliest known paintings is from the Harmsen collection, an oil titled "Town", dated 1910; that painting is signed "Dan Muller" lower left within a line drawing of a buffalo).

Style
Stylistically Muller's early works follow the Impressionism of C M Russell. Later works tended more toward Realism and a documentarian style.

Representation in other media
Muller is a character in Larry McMurtry's "Telegraph Days." This is a fictional account of the closing decades of the western frontier viewed through the eyes of Nellie Courtright and her brother Jackson from a town named Rita Blanca in what would become the Oklahoma Panhandle. Nellie goes to work for Buffalo Bill and while at his ranch in North Platte, Nebraska hangs out with Buffalo Bill's adopted "nephew" Danny Muller.

References

 Montana Historical Society
 Nevada Historical Society
 Montana Magazine of Western History Vol XVI October 1966 No.4
 WHO WAS WHO IN AMERICAN ART-1897-1947-PETER H FALK
 Lubbock Avalanche-Journal May 16, 1965 pg 4-f
 Artists of the American West: A Biographical Dictionary ;Doris Ostrander Dawdy, Chicago: Sage Books pgs 205–206.
 The WPA Guide to 1930's Nevada (University of Nevada Press: 1940) pg 105
 The Pueblo Chieftain, March 12, 2004
 The Independent Record, Helena MT, October 23, 1966
 Reno Evening Gazette, June 9, 1936 & July 1938
 Nevada State Journal, January 25, 1936, pg 4 & April 27, 1936, pg 8 & May 3, 1939 & March 25, 1951
 Chicago Daily Tribune, July 9, 1933 & April 10, 1949
 The Sheboygan Press, January 13, 1949, pg 14 & May 13, 1949 pg 4
 Esquire magazine, Autumn 1933
 askart.com

Footnotes
 Footnote 1: Muller's allegation regarding his life with Buffalo Bill appeared as early as July 1938 in the Reno Evening Gazette and in the May 3, 1939 Reno Nevada State Journal. The latter article cites a letter written to Dan Muller dated May 31, 1910 and written on stationery proclaiming "Buffalo Bill's WILD WEST combined with Pawnee Bill's great FAR EAST" which references Mr. Muller working with Buffalo Bill's horses; it was signed "Your friend, W F Cody". (Cody did write letters under this letterhead- see here). A Nevada State Journal article from 1951 states that "Muller displayed a number of letters written to him in his youth by Cody." It is worth noting that the Buffalo Bill Historical Center denies there being any historical record of Muller working for, or being the adopted son of Cody although they state that "What appears to be true is that he knew BB and Louisa."(1) The artist's description of the town of Cody from that time, as well as some of its residents, is considered accurate (1). Cody had a foster son, Johnny Baker, whose early years sound similar to those described by Muller in his book; perhaps Baker's story served as the blueprint for Dan Muller's alleged relationship to Cody.(For more information regarding Dan Muller and the Buffalo Bill connection see here).
 (1)BBHC email dated 04/10/08
 Footnote 2: There was another Daniel Muller active in the early 1900s, aka D C Muller, a carver of carousel horses; perhaps that is why Daniel Cody Muller did not use the D C Muller signature prior to about the 1920s; as far as is known there is no connection between the two Muller's other than the name.

Artists of the American West
1889 births
1976 deaths
20th-century American painters
American male painters
People from Elko, Nevada
People from Choteau, Montana
People from Port Washington, Wisconsin
20th-century American male artists